Deborah Arnie Arnesen (born October 1, 1953), is an American radio show host and former politician, serving for eight years as a member of the New Hampshire House of Representatives.

Early life 
Arnesen was born in Brooklyn, New York to a Norwegian father and an Italian mother.

Political career 
Arnesen is a former fellow of the Harvard Institute of Politics, and a former member of the New Hampshire House of Representatives from Orford, New Hampshire, serving from 1984 to 1992. She was the Democratic nominee in the 1992 New Hampshire gubernatorial election and also ran for U.S. Congress in 1996. She was the first woman in New Hampshire history to be nominated by a major political party in a race for governor. She was elected to the Common Cause National Governing Board in 1993 and again in 1997.

Arnesen has supported a broad-based tax plan in New Hampshire, rejecting The Pledge and supporting the establishment of a state-level income tax.

Media career 
Arnesen is the host of The Attitude on WNHN 94.7FM in New Hampshire. She has also made several appearances on C-SPAN.

Personal life 
Arnesen has two daughters, Melissa Arnesen-Trunzo (born 1983) and Kirsten Arnesen-Trunzo (born 1985) from her relationship with Thomas Trunzo. She met Martin J. Capodice in 2000 and married him in 2002. He died in 2013.

References

External links
 Harvard University Institute of Politics: Deborah "Arnie" Arnesen

1953 births
Living people
Democratic Party members of the New Hampshire House of Representatives
People from Brooklyn
St. Olaf College alumni
Vermont Law and Graduate School alumni
Women state legislators in New Hampshire
People from Orford, New Hampshire
21st-century American women